The 1974 South African Open, also known by its sponsored name South African Breweries Open, was a combined men's and women's tennis tournament played on outdoor hard courts in Johannesburg, South Africa that was part of the 1974 Commercial Union Assurance Grand Prix. It was the 71st edition of the tournament and was held from 18 November through 26 November 1974. Jimmy Connors and Kerry Melville won the singles titles.

Finals

Men's singles
 Jimmy Connors defeated  Arthur Ashe 7–6, 6–3, 6–1

Women's singles
 Kerry Melville defeated  Dianne Fromholtz 6–3, 7–5

Men's doubles
 Bob Hewitt /  Frew McMillan defeated  Tom Okker /  Marty Riessen 7–5, 6–4, 6–3

Women's doubles
 Ilana Kloss /  Kerry Melville defeated  Margaret Court /  Dianne Fromholtz 6–2, 6–3

References

South African Open
South African Open (tennis)
Open
Sports competitions in Johannesburg
1970s in Johannesburg
November 1974 sports events in Africa